Kuka teki huorin is the fourth album of Finnish rock band Sielun Veljet. It is written in a style similar to their breakthrough album L'amourha, and the band was criticized by Soundi magazine for repeating itself. The album maintains the fiercely energetic and repetitive style of Sielun Veljet with some funk influences, while at the same time being considered one of their more accessible recordings.

Kuka teki huorin was certified gold in 1995, being one of two Sielun Veljet studio albums to achieve a gold record.

Reception

Track listing
All songs by Ismo Alanko, except where noted.
 "Ajá" (Alanko, Orma) -- 1:46
 "Kuka teki huorin"—4:56
 "Museossa"—4:34
 "Säkenöivä voima"—3:00
 "Kaksin"—4:45
 "Kansallispäivä" (Alanko, Orma) -- 4:28
 "Mustamaalaan"—3:12
 "Kemiaa" (Alanko, Orma) -- 2:27
 "Joku kuuntelee" (Alanko, Orma) -- 4:01
 "Kristallilapsia" (Alanko, Orma) -- 4:36

Personnel
 Ismo Alanko -- vocals, guitar, bass, piano
 Jukka Orma—guitar, vocals
 Jouko Hohko -- bass, guitar, vocals
 Alf Forsman -- drums, percussion

References

1986 albums
Sielun Veljet albums